Tunç is a Turkish name and may refer to:

Given name
 Tunç Başaran (1938–2019), Turkish screenwriter
 Tunç Erem (born 1938), Turkish academic
 Tunç Hamarat (born 1946), Turkish chess player
 Tunch Ilkin (1957-2021), Turkish player of American football and sports broadcaster

Surname
 Ayfer Tunç (born 1964), Turkish writer
 Ferhat Tunc (born 1964), Turkish musician
 Onno Tunç (1948–1996), Turkish-Armenian musician
 Ramazan Tunç (born 1975), Turkish footballer

Turkish-language surnames
Turkish masculine given names